A data store is a repository for persistently storing and managing collections of data which include not just repositories like databases, but also simpler store types such as simple files, emails, etc.

A database is a series of bytes that is managed by a database management system (DBMS). A file is a series of bytes that is managed by a file system. Thus, any database or file is a series of bytes that, once stored, is called a data store.

MATLAB and Cloud Storage systems like VMware, Firefox OS use datastore as a term for abstracting collections of data inside their respective applications.

Types
Data store can refer to a broad class of storage systems including:
 Paper files
 Simple files like a spreadsheet
 File systems
 Email storage systems (both server and client systems)
 Databases
Relational databases, based on the relational model of data
 Object-oriented databases. They can save objects of an object-oriented design.
 NoSQL databases
Key-value databases
Wide Column Store
Graph databases
 Distributed data stores
 Directory services
 VMware uses the term datastore to refer to a file that stores a virtual machine

See also 
 Data architecture
 Data flow diagram
 Database
 Distributed data store

References 

Databases
Database management systems